"Gotta Get Away" is a song by American rock band The Offspring. It is the fourth track and third single from their breakthrough album, Smash (1994). The song was a modest hit in several countries, but peaked at No. 6 on Billboard's Modern Rock charts. "Gotta Get Away" was inspired by an early track, "Cogs", written while the band was still named Manic Subsidal. Although the song was a big hit, it did not reach the heights nor achieve the popularity, success, airplay, or sales of the album's previous singles "Come Out and Play" and "Self Esteem".

The song had two single covers. The first, the cover for the CD single, depicts a skeleton in the same style as the previous singles from Smash - "Come Out And Play" and "Self Esteem". The second, the cover for the 7" vinyl, shows the actor from the video standing outside the coliseum, his eyes covered by the song title.

The song also appears as the same numbered track on their Greatest Hits (2005).

Content
The lyrics refer to the pressure that lead singer Dexter Holland was under to finish the album on time.

Track listing

CD single

Sweden CD maxi and U.K. 7" black vinyl

Music video
The video starts with a boy entering a coliseum where a mosh pit breaks out while the band plays. It is predominantly in black and white. The video ends with the same boy lying on the floor alone.

The music video for the song was directed by Samuel Bayer and filmed at the Fairgrounds Coliseum in Salt Lake City, UT on December 17, 1994.

DVD appearances
The music video also appears on the Complete Music Video Collection DVD, released in 2005.

Charts

References

External links

The Offspring songs
1995 singles
Music videos directed by Samuel Bayer
Songs written by Dexter Holland
1994 songs